An Dúbh choraidh or An Dúcharaidh (anglicized as Doochary), meaning "the black weir", is a small village in the Rosses area of County Donegal, Ireland. Doochary is within the Gaeltacht, meaning the Irish language is the main language used there. Doochary was awarded the Tidy Towns award in 1997.

See also
 List of towns and villages in Ireland

References

Gaeltacht places in County Donegal
Gaeltacht towns and villages
The Rosses
Towns and villages in County Donegal